These species belong to Ponana, a genus of leafhoppers in the family Cicadellidae.

Ponana species

 Ponana aenea 
 Ponana albosignata 
 Ponana amana DeLong, Wolda & Estribi, 1983
 Ponana ampa DeLong, 1977
 Ponana anela DeLong & Freytag, 1967
 Ponana anepa DeLong & Freytag, 1967
 Ponana aquila 
 Ponana areya DeLong, 1981
 Ponana atea DeLong & Freytag, 1967
 Ponana aurata DeLong & Freytag, 1967
 Ponana avena DeLong & Freytag, 1967
 Ponana balloui DeLong, 1981
 Ponana bera DeLong & Freytag, 1967
 Ponana berta DeLong & Freytag, 1967
 Ponana bisignata Fowler, 1903
 Ponana bola DeLong & Freytag, 1967
 Ponana boquetea DeLong, Wolda & Estribi, 1983
 Ponana cacozela 
 Ponana candida 
 Ponana cephalata DeLong, 1977
 Ponana cerella DeLong & Freytag, 1967
 Ponana cerosa DeLong & Freytag, 1967
 Ponana cesta DeLong & Freytag, 1967
 Ponana chiapa DeLong & Freytag, 1967
 Ponana cincta DeLong & Freytag, 1967
 Ponana citrina (Spangberg, 1878)
 Ponana clavella DeLong, Wolda & Estribi, 1983
 Ponana cleta DeLong & Freytag, 1967
 Ponana conspersa Spångberg, 1878
 Ponana curiata Gibson, 1919
 Ponana dana DeLong & Freytag, 1967
 Ponana demela DeLong & Freytag, 1967
 Ponana distortia DeLong & Freytag, 1967
 Ponana divergens DeLong & Freytag, 1967
 Ponana divisa DeLong & Cwikla, 1988
 Ponana dohrni 
 Ponana dulera DeLong & Freytag, 1967
 Ponana extensa DeLong, 1942
 Ponana fastosa Metcalf & Bruner, 1949
 Ponana floridana 
 Ponana fortina DeLong & Freytag, 1967
 Ponana fuscara DeLong & Martinson, 1980
 Ponana guatama DeLong & Freytag, 1967
 Ponana hieroglyphica Fowler, 1903
 Ponana hilara DeLong & Martinson, 1973
 Ponana inflata DeLong, 1942
 Ponana integra DeLong, 1942
 Ponana irheae DeLong, Wolda & Estribi, 1983
 Ponana limbatipennis 
 Ponana limonea 
 Ponana magna Caldwell, 1952
 Ponana meadi DeLong & Martinson, 1980
 Ponana mexella DeLong & Freytag, 1967
 Ponana modesta Spångberg, 1883
 Ponana notula Fowler, 1903
 Ponana occlusa 
 Ponana ornatata DeLong & Kolbe, 1974
 Ponana ornatella DeLong, 1981
 Ponana ortha DeLong, Wolda & Estribi, 1983
 Ponana pamana DeLong & Freytag, 1967
 Ponana pana DeLong & Freytag, 1967
 Ponana panera DeLong & Martinson, 1973
 Ponana pauperata 
 Ponana pectoralis (Spangberg, 1878)
 Ponana pertenua DeLong, 1977
 Ponana perusana DeLong, 1980
 Ponana propior 
 Ponana puertoricensis Caldwell, 1952
 Ponana punctatella 
 Ponana puncticollis (Spangberg, 1878)
 Ponana punctipennis 
 Ponana pura DeLong, 1942
 Ponana quadralaba DeLong, 1942
 Ponana quadriproba DeLong, Wolda & Estribi, 1983
 Ponana reservanda Fowler, 1903
 Ponana rubida DeLong, 1942
 Ponana rubrapuncta 
 Ponana sandersi DeLong, 1977
 Ponana scarlatina (Fitch, 1851)
 Ponana sena DeLong & Martinson, 1973
 Ponana seresa DeLong & Martinson, 1973
 Ponana serrella DeLong & Martinson, 1973
 Ponana serrens DeLong, 1977
 Ponana sonora Ball
 Ponana sparsa 
 Ponana tabula DeLong & Martinson, 1973
 Ponana tama DeLong & Freytag, 1967
 Ponana tamala DeLong & Freytag, 1967
 Ponana tena DeLong & Freytag, 1967
 Ponana tresa DeLong & Freytag, 1967
 Ponana tura DeLong & Freytag, 1967
 Ponana valeda DeLong & Freytag, 1967
 Ponana vandera DeLong & Freytag, 1967
 Ponana vebera DeLong & Freytag, 1967
 Ponana vedala DeLong & Freytag, 1967
 Ponana velora DeLong & Freytag, 1967
 Ponana vinula Stål, 1864
 Ponana virga DeLong, Wolda & Estribi, 1983
 Ponana volara DeLong & Freytag, 1967
 Ponana vulana DeLong & Freytag, 1967
 Ponana woodruffi DeLong & Martinson, 1980
 Ponana xarela DeLong & Freytag, 1967
 Ponana xella DeLong & Freytag, 1967
 Ponana xena DeLong & Freytag, 1967
 Ponana xila DeLong & Freytag, 1967
 Ponana xola DeLong & Freytag, 1967
 Ponana yena DeLong & Freytag, 1967
 Ponana yera DeLong & Freytag, 1967
 Ponana yura DeLong & Freytag, 1967

References

Ponana